Shaman Rock, Cape Burhan, or Shamanka is a rock, on Olkhon Island, Lake Baikal, Russia. It is in Pribaikalsky National Park, and is near Khuzhir, the largest city on Olkhon Island.

The rock connects to Olkhon Island, though depending on perspective, can appear an island.

The rock is considered one of the "Nine Holy Sites of Asia".

On the rock

In the near-bank part of the rock is the Shaman Cave, which formed via weathering and erosion.

On the western side of the surface of the back of the rock there is a natural brown rock formation resembling a dragon.

See also

 Buddhism
 Maloe More
 Tibetan Buddhism

References

External links

Olkhon Island